Bergen Park is a park near Evergreen, Colorado. It is on the National Register of Historic Places.

Bergen Park was established in 1859 when pioneer settler Thomas Cunningham Bergen built a log cabin on his land and named his property.

See also
 Denver Mountain Parks

References

External links
SingleTracks.com: Bike Trails- Ridge Trail bike trail details

Parks on the National Register of Historic Places in Colorado
Protected areas established in 1915
Denver Mountain Parks
Protected areas of Jefferson County, Colorado
Historic districts on the National Register of Historic Places in Colorado
National Register of Historic Places in Jefferson County, Colorado